Kamei (亀井, "turtle well") is a Japanese surname.

Japanese clan, Kamei clan
People that have the name include:
Akiko Kamei, politician
Eri Kamei, member of Morning Musume
Fumio Kamei, documentary film director
, Japanese fencer
Hirotada Kamei(亀井広忠), tsuzumi player
Hisaoki Kamei, politician
Ikuo Kamei, politician
Kaori Kamei(亀井薫), announcer
Katsuichiro Kamei(亀井勝一郎), literary critic
Koreaki Kamei, announcer
Saburo Kamei, voice actor
, Japanese ice hockey player
Shizuka Kamei, politician
Yoshiko Kamei, voice actor
Yoshiyuki Kamei, politician
Yoshiyuki Kamei,  baseball player
Zentaro Kamei, politician

Japanese-language surnames